Melhania annua is a plant in the family Malvaceae, native to East Africa.

Description
The flowers have yellow petals.

Distribution and habitat
Melhania annua is native to Somalia and Kenya. Only 12 specimen sites are known. Its habitat is coastal sand dunes.

References

annua
Flora of Somalia
Flora of Kenya
Plants described in 1999